Gonzalo Peillat (born 12 August 1992) is an Argentine-German field hockey player who plays as a defender for German club Mannheimer HC and for the Germany national team. In 2015, Peillat was awarded the FIH 2014 Rising Star of the Year.

He ended his Argentina career with a total of 153 caps and 176 goals and he is also considered as one of the greatest Argentine field hockey players of all-time. He represented Argentina in field hockey from 2011 to 2018 before switching his allegiance to Germany as of 2022. His girlfriend Florencia Habif is also a field hockey player.

Club career
Peillat played for Club Ferrocarril Mitre in Argentina until the 2014 World Cup. After this tournament, he wanted to improve his play so he transferred to the Netherlands to play for HGC. During the 2014 Dutch winter break he played his first season in the Hockey India League for the Kalinga Lancers and in the 2015 Hockey India League played for the Uttar Pradesh Wizards. After he became topscorer in the 2015–16 Dutch hoofdklasse season with 33 goals, he transferred to German club Mannheimer HC. In the 2016 and 2017 German winterbreak he again played for the Uttar Pradesh Wizards in the 2016 and 2017 Hockey India League. In the 2018 winter break when there was no Hockey India League, he played in the Malaysia Hockey League for Terengganu Hockey Team. In April 2018 he renewed his contract for Mannheim for another three years until 2021. He also participated in the premier division hockey league in Bangladesh for Mohameddan Sporting Club.

International career

Argentina career 
He was part of Argentine squad which emerged as runners-up to New Zealand in the final of the 2012 Sultan Azlan Shah Cup. He was included in the Argentine field hockey squad for the 2012 Summer Olympics and he also made his Olympic debut during the 2012 London Olympics. He was the top goalscorer for Argentina during the men's field hockey competition during the 2012 Summer Olympics with a tally of four goals and Argentina bowed out of the competition with a tenth place finish. He was the top goalscorer during the 2012 Men's Pan-Am Junior Championship with 15 goals and Argentina eventually won the title by beating Canada in the final. He was a key member of the Argentina squad which won the 2013 Men's Pan American Cup and he scored a hat-trick in the final of the competition against Canada and he scored all four goals in the final for Argentina as they won the final 4-0. He was also the top goalscorer for Argentina at the 2013 Men's Hockey Junior World Cup with four goals. He was a member of the Argentine sqaud which won the 2013 Men's South American Hockey Championship.

He was named in Argentine squad for the 2014 Men's FIH Hockey World Cup and it also marked his maiden FIH Hockey World Cup appearance. He was a vital cog of the Argentine hockey team which endured a dream run at the 2014 Men's Hockey World Cup where Argentina secured a third place finish which remains the best ever performance for Argentina to date in a single edition of the FIH Men's Hockey World Cup. He scored the only goal for Argentina during their semi-final defeat to Australia 5-1 and Argentina claimed their first ever World Cup medal by defeating England 2-0 in the third place play-off during the 2014 World Cup campaign. He ended the 2014 Hockey World Cup on a high note as the top goalscorer of the tournament with 10 goals. He was part of the Argentina squad which qualified to the quarter-final of the 2014 Men's Hockey Champions Trophy.

He was a key member of the Argentine squad which claimed gold medal in the men's field hockey competition during the 2014 South American Games and he was also the top goalscorer of the competition with a tally of 16 goals. He was the top goalscorer at the 2014–15 Men's FIH Hockey World League Final with 8 goals. He was a crucial member of the Argentine squad which claimed gold medal in the men's field hockey tournament at the 2015 Pan American Games and was also the top goalscorer of the competition with a tally of 14 goals.

He was named in Argentine field hockey squad for the 2016 Summer Olympics and it marked his second Olympic appearance in Argentina colours. He scored a hat-trick in Argentina's epic win over defending Olympic champions Germany during the semi-final of the 2016 Summer Olympic men's field hockey tournament which helped Argentina to qualify for the final of the competition. All of his three goals came from the penalty corner in the first half of the match as Argentina defeated favourites Germany 5-2 in the semi-final to set up a grand final with Belgium. He also scored a goal in the final of the Olympic hockey tournament and Argentina defeated Belgium 4-2 to clinch the Olympic hockey gold medal for the very first time. He was adjudged as the top goalscorer during the men's field hockey tournament at 2016 Summer Olympics with 11 goals. He was an integral member of the Argentine squad which emerged as runners-up to Australia at the 2016–17 Men's FIH Hockey World League Final and he was the top goalscorer for Argentina during the 2016–17 Men's FIH Hockey World League with three goals. He was part of the Argentina squad which won the 2017 Men's Pan American Cup and he was the joint top goalscorer of the competition alongside fellow Argentine player Matías Paredes with seven goals.

He was the top goalscorer of the 2018 Sultan Azlan Shah Cup with 8 goals and he was a vital member of the Argentina side which secured third place during the competition. During the openng match of the 2018 Sultan Azlan Shah Cup between Argentina and India, he scored a hat-trick which sealed the deal for Argentina in a close encounter where Argentina won 3-2. He was also the top goalscorer at the 2018 Men's Hockey Champions Trophy with a tally of 6 goals. He was part of the Argentina squad which emerged as runners-up to Germany at the 2018 Men's Hockey Düsseldorf Masters and he was the joint top goalscorer of the tournament for Argentina alongside Martin Ferreiro with two goals. He was the top goalscorer for Argentina during the 2018 FIH Men's Hockey World Cup with 6 and he was also the second leading goalscorer during the course of the tournament just behind Blake Govers and Alexander Hendrickx's tally of 7 goals. He also scored a brace in Argentina's defeat to England in the quarter-final clash of the 2018 Hockey World Cup which also eventually marked his last ever international appearance for him in Argentina colours and Argentina bowed out of the tournament with a disappointing seventh place finish.

He also openly publicly criticised the state of hockey in Argentina especially aftermath Argentina's 2018 World Cup campaign. He also pointed out allegations regarding favoritism and player politics in team selection and lack of passion in Argentine hockey. He alongside fellow hockey player Joaquín Menini pinpointed the loopholes in Argentine hockey especially highlighting how the game was managed in the country. Reports also surfaced regarding rift between Peillat and the then Argentine skipper Agustín Mazzilli during the 2018 FIH Men's Hockey World Cup and the tensions embroiled further with Argentina's shock loss to England 2-3 in the quarter-finals which eventually ended the World Cup campaign for Argentina. Peillat along with Menini soon decided to walk away from Argentine hockey also due to both being ignored mostly by the Argentine hockey fraternity. He also reportedly engaged in a dispute with the Argentine head coach German Orozco in January 2019 and as a result, Peillat took a break from the Argentine national team.

Germany career 
In late February 2022, Peillat acquired German citizenship and its national team coach André Henning asked permission from the International Hockey Federation for him to be part of the squad. On 7 March 2022, Peillat was listed for the first time as a German player to compete in the 2021-2022 Pro League Series. He made his international debut in Germany colours on 26 March 2022 against Spain during the 2021–22 Men's FIH Pro League.

He starred in Germany's dramatic come-from-behind win against world no 1 team Australia during the semi-finals of the 2023 FIH Hockey World Cup by scoring a hat-trick in the second half of the match to help Germany to qualify for the final of the tournament. Germany was trailing at 2-0 during halfway mark but clinched victory from the jaws of defeat against Australia albeit of Peillat's sensational hat-trick of goals and the match regulation time ended with Germany winning the tightly fought contest 4-3 at the end of the fourth quarter. Peillat scored from the penalty corners in the 43rd, 52nd and 59th minutes of the semi-final to stun Australia in order to help Germany reach their fourth ever Hockey World Cup final.

See also 

 List of men's field hockey players with 100 or more international goals

Honours

Club
Mannheimer HC
 German national title: 2016–17

International
Argentina
 Summer Olympics: 2016
 Pan American Games: 2015
 Pan American Cup: 2013, 2017
 South American Games: 2014
 South American Championships: 2013
 Pan American Junior Championship: 2012

Germany
 World Cup: 2023

Individual
 Summer Olympics top goalscorer: 2016
 Hockey World Cup top goalscorer: 2014
 Pan American Games top goalscorer: 2015
 Pan American Cup top goalscorer: 2017
 Champions Trophy top goalscorer: 2018
 South American Games top goalscorer: 2014
 Sultan Azlan Shah Cup top goalscorer: 2018
 FIH Rising Star of the Year: 2014

References

External links
 

1992 births
Living people
Field hockey players from Buenos Aires
Argentine people of French descent
Argentine male field hockey players
Male field hockey defenders
Field hockey players at the 2012 Summer Olympics
2014 Men's Hockey World Cup players
Field hockey players at the 2015 Pan American Games
Field hockey players at the 2016 Summer Olympics
2018 Men's Hockey World Cup players
Olympic field hockey players of Argentina
Pan American Games gold medalists for Argentina
Olympic gold medalists for Argentina
Olympic medalists in field hockey
Medalists at the 2016 Summer Olympics
Pan American Games medalists in field hockey
South American Games gold medalists for Argentina
South American Games medalists in field hockey
HGC players
Hockey India League players
Uttar Pradesh Wizards players
Competitors at the 2014 South American Games
Mannheimer HC players
Men's Hoofdklasse Hockey players
Medalists at the 2015 Pan American Games
German male field hockey players
2023 Men's FIH Hockey World Cup players